Benjamin Ayloffe may refer to:

Sir Benjamin Ayloffe, 2nd Baronet (1592–1662), of the Ayloffe baronets, MP for Essex 1661–1662
Sir Benjamin Ayloffe, 4th Baronet (1631–1722), of the Ayloffe baronets, English merchant

See also
Ayloffe (surname)